Badzaat (lit:low-born) is a Pakistani romantic drama television series produced by Abdullah Kadwani and Asad Qureshi under their banner 7th Sky Entertainment and first aired on Har Pal Geo on 2 March 2022. It is written by Misbah Nosheen and directed by Siraj-ul-Haque. The series stars Imran Ashraf and Urwa Hocane in leading roles with the supporting cast of Ali Abbas, Saba Faisal, Mehmood Aslam, Zainab Qayyum, Zoya Nasir, Nida Mumtaz and Sidra Niazi.

Cast 

 Imran Ashraf as Wali Asfandali, Laila begum's biological son who is raised by Mehwish Begum, his father's second wife as her own child. He is an impulsive young man with a heart of gold. Later Anabiya's husband
 Urwa Hocane as Anabiya  ex wife of Daniyal, a distant relative of Wali and Danyal. She is also Wali's love interest and later wife of Wali 
 Ali Abbas as Daniyal Akber Hussain Ex Husband of Anabiya who is dating Huda and Annie. A loose charactered man who has a lot of spite for Wali because of his success. (Dead)
 Saba Faisal as Laila Begum Wali's biological mother who was a tawaif by profession.
 Nida Mumtaz as Narmeem Begum, Danyal's mother and Wali's aunt. She is as evil as her son.
 Mehmood Aslam as Akber Hussain, Danyal's father and Wali's paternal uncle.
 Zainab Qayyum as Mehrunisa Begum, Anabia's mother. (Dead)
 Zoya Nasir as Ainnie Khan, Wali younger step-sister who is dating daniyal 
 Sidra Niazi as Qandeel Akber Hussain & Qandeel Kashif, Danyal's sister and Wali's cousin. 
 Zohreh Amir as Huda 
 Sajida Syed as Mehwish Begum, Wali's adoptive mother. She loves and cares for Wali like her own child.
 Danial Afzal Khan as Kashif; Qandeel's Husband
 Birjees Farooqui as Faria Begum
 Anas Ali Imran
 Hanif Muhammad
 Ayesha Mirza
 Akhtar Ghazali
 Dr. Wajahat
 Fahad Sherwani
 Faisal Naqvi
 Imran Bawa 
 Mehboob Sultan
 Haroon Kadwani as Ashraf
 Naeem Sheikh
 Rohi Ghazali
 Sohail Masood 
 Urooj Abbas

References 

2022 Pakistani television series debuts